Telefónica (also Black Jack) is a Volvo Open 70 yacht. She finished fourth in the 2011–12 Volvo Ocean Race skippered by Iker Martínez.

References

Volvo Ocean Race yachts
Volvo Open 70 yachts
Sailing yachts of Spain
Sydney to Hobart Yacht Race yachts